Utrecht Lunetten is a railway station located in Utrecht, Netherlands. The station originally opened on 10 June 1874 and is located on the Utrecht–Boxtel railway and the Hilversum–Lunetten railway (via Utrecht Maliebaan). The station closed on 15 May 1932. The station was re-opened on 25 September 1980. The services are currently operated by Nederlandse Spoorwegen.

When new the station was just an interchange station between the Utrecht - 's-Hertogenbosch line and the Hilversum - Utrecht Lunetten services. There was no entrance/exit to the station, so its sole purpose was for the interchange of these lines.

Train services

The following services currently call at Utrecht Lunetten:
2x per hour local service (sprinter) Woerden - Utrecht - Geldermalsen - Tiel
2x per hour local service (sprinter) The Hague - Utrecht - Geldermalsen - 's-Hertogenbosch
The railway tracks were doubled in order to separate local from Intercity services.

Bus services
 8 -  Utrecht Lunetten - Tolsteeg - Centraal Station - Centrum - Sterrenwijk
 10 - Utrecht Lunetten - Kanaleneiland - Oudenrijn - Leidsche Rijn
 15 - Utrecht Lunetten - Tolsteeg - Hoograven (during evenings and Weekends)

External links
NS website 
Dutch Public Transport journey planner 

Lunetten
Railway stations opened in 1874
Railway stations closed in 1932
Railway stations opened in 1980
Railway stations on the Staatslijn H
1980 establishments in the Netherlands
Railway stations in the Netherlands opened in the 20th century